Piriá River may refer to

 Piriá River (Pará River), a tributary of the Pará River, Brazil
 Piriá River (Eastern Pará), a river in the extreme east of the state of Pará, Brazil, that flows into the Atlantic Ocean